"Silence ga Ippai" (Japanese: サイレンスがいっぱい, lit. "A Lot of Silence," translated as "Filled With Silence") is the sixth single by Kiyotaka Sugiyama & Omega Tribe, released by VAP on May 29, 1985. The single comes from the best-of album, Single's History, making it the only single album from Kiyotaka Sugiyama & Omega Tribe that was not recorded on an original album. It is also the first single performed as a five-member formation, after guitarist Kenji Yoshida left the band.

"Silence ga Ippai" was used in NTV drama, Non-neechan, 200W (のン姉ちゃん、200W).

The single peaked at #7 on the Oricon charts.

Track listing

Single

Charts

Weekly charts

Year-end charts

References 

1985 singles
Omega Tribe (Japanese band) songs
1985 songs
Songs with lyrics by Chinfa Kan
Songs written by Tetsuji Hayashi